Haworthiopsis limifolia, formerly Haworthia limifolia, is a species of flowering plant in the genus Haworthiopsis, native to southern Africa and first described in 1910.

Distribution
It is native to southeastern Africa (southern Mozambique, Swaziland, KwaZulu-Natal, and Mpumalanga).

Varieties
It is a relatively widespread species, with several known varieties, including arcana, gigantea, glaucophylla, keithii, striata, ubomboensis.

References

limifolia
Flora of Mozambique
Flora of Southern Africa
Garden plants
Plants described in 1910